The Clérette is a river of Normandy, France,  in length, flowing through the department of Seine-Maritime. It is a right tributary of the Cailly.

Geography 
The Clérette has its source in the northern part of the territory of the commune of Clères. Taking a southern route, it passes the hamlet of Le Tot then flows through the commune of Anceaumeville, meeting the Cailly at Montville.

See also 
French water management scheme

Bibliography 
Albert Hennetier, Aux sources normandes: Promenade au fil des rivières en Seine-Maritime, Ed. Bertout, Luneray, 2006

References

Rivers of France
Rivers of Normandy
Rivers of Seine-Maritime